Brønnøy is a municipality in Nordland county, Norway. It is part of the Helgeland region. The administrative centre and commercial centre of the municipality is the town of Brønnøysund. 

A secondary centre is the village of Hommelstø. Other villages include Tosbotn, Lande, Trælnes, and Indreskomo.

The Brønnøysund Register Centre is an important employer in Brønnøy. Also, one of the largest limestone mines in Northern Europe is located in the municipality. Brønnøysund Airport, Brønnøy is located near the town of Brønnøysund.

The  municipality is the 107th largest by area out of the 356 municipalities in Norway. Brønnøy is the 132nd most populous municipality in Norway with a population of 7,777.

General information
The municipality of Brønnøy was established on 1 January 1838 (see formannskapsdistrikt law). On 1 October 1875 the eastern district (population: 1,162) was separated to become the new municipality of Velfjord. This left Brønnøy with 4,156 residents.

Then on 1 January 1901, the southwestern district (population: 2,731) was separated to become the new municipality of Vik (which later changed its name to Sømna). Brønnøy was then left with 3,440 inhabitants. On 1 January 1923 the large village of Brønnøysund (population: 948) was separated from Brønnøy to become a town (ladested).

During the 1960s, there were many municipal mergers across Norway due to the work of the Schei Committee. On 1 January 1964, a major municipal merger took place. The following areas were merged to form a new, larger Brønnøy municipality.
the town of Brønnøysund (population: 2,064)
the municipality of Sømna (population: 2,347)
the municipality of Brønnøy (population: 2,635)
the municipality of Velfjord (population: 1,380)
the part of Bindal municipality located Lande-Tosbotn area around the inner Bindalsfjorden (population: 296)

Just thirteen years later on 1 January 1977, most of the former municipality of Sømna was separated from Brønnøy once again to become its own municipality. The Hongset area of the old Sømna municipality remained in Brønnøy.

Name
The municipality (originally the parish) is named after the small island Brønnøya, since the first church was built there. The first element is brunnr which means "well" and the last element is øy which means "island". Islands with freshwater wells were important for seafarers.

Coat of arms
The coat of arms was granted on 20 May 1988. The official blazon is "Or a balisage signal sable". This means the arms have a field (background) that has a tincture of Or which means it is commonly colored yellow, but if it is made out of metal, then gold is used. The charge is a navigational marker which is used to signal directions for navigation within a harbour. The charge represents the importance of boating and harbours in this seaside municipality. The arms were designed by Rolf Tidemann, a graphic artist from Brønnøysund.

Churches
The Church of Norway has two parishes within the municipality of Brønnøy. It is part of the Sør-Helgeland prosti (deanery) in the Diocese of Sør-Hålogaland.

Geography
The municipality has great scenic variety with numerous islets, lakes (such as Eidevatnet, Sausvatnet, and Fjellvatnet), mountains, and some fertile agricultural areas. Torget island is connected to the mainland via the Brønnøysund Bridge.

Brønnøy borders the municipalities of Vega and Vevelstad to the north, Vefsn and Grane to the east, and Bindal and Sømna to the south. The large fjord Velfjorden runs into the heart of the municipality.

Nature
In the southwest is the island of Torget, with the mountain Torghatten, is famous for a cavity that goes straight through the structure. Lomsdal–Visten National Park is located in the northeastern part of Brønnøy.

The world's most northerly naturally occurring small-leaved lime (linden) forests grows in Brønnøy, and there are patches of boreal rainforests in Grønlidalen nature reserve and Storhaugen nature reserve. Strompdalen nature reserve and Horsvær nature reserve, a nesting place for a rich variety of seabirds, are also located in the municipality.

Climate
Brønnøy has a temperate oceanic climate with mild winters with all monthly mean temperatures above freezing (Koppen Cfb). The growing season is also long for the latitude. There is a lot of precipitation, with significant precipitation in all months. Autumn and early winter is the wettest season and October the wettest month. The driest season is spring and early summer with May as the driest month. There have been weather stations in Brønnøy since 1873. 9 of the 12 monthly all-time lows are from 1940 or older; 3 from before 1900. The all-time low  was recorded in February 1966, and the all-time high  was set on 27 July 2019. Inland areas of the municipality will have colder winters.

Government
All municipalities in Norway, including Brønnøy, are responsible for primary education (through 10th grade), outpatient health services, senior citizen services, unemployment and other social services, zoning, economic development, and municipal roads. The municipality is governed by a municipal council of elected representatives, which in turn elect a mayor.  The municipality falls under the Brønnøy District Court and the Hålogaland Court of Appeal.

Municipal council
The municipal council of Brønnøy is made up of 27 representatives that are elected to four year terms. The party breakdown of the council is as follows:

Notable people

 Hans Rosing (1625 at Brønnøy – 1699) a clergyman, Bishop of the Diocese of Oslo 1664-1699
 Skule Storheill (1907 in Brønnøysund – 1992) a prominent Norwegian naval officer
 Kristine Andersen Vesterfjell (1910 in Lomsdalen – 1987) a South Sami reindeer herder and cultural advocate
 Kåre Rodahl (1917 in Brønnøysund – 2008) a physician, physiologist, a research fellow in Arctic physiology and medicine and professor at the Norwegian School of Sport Sciences
 Odd Grønmo (1922 in Brønnøy - 2012) a Norwegian politician, Mayor of Bodin & Nordland
 Ørjar Øyen (born 1927 in Brønnøy) a Norwegian sociologist and academic
 Dag Skogheim (1928–2015) a teacher, poet, novelist, biographer and non-fiction writer; grew up in Brønnøysund
 Halle Jørn Hanssen (born 1937 in Brønnøy) a TV correspondent, development aid administrator and politician
 Rawdna Carita Eira (born 1970) a Norwegian and Sámi playwright, author, teacher, reindeer herder and stage manager; grew up in Brønnøysund 
 Pål Arne Johansen (born 1977 in Brønnøy) a retired football midfielder and manager.
 Ulrik Saltnes (born 1992 in Brønnøysund) a Norwegian footballer with almost 200 club caps

See also
Norwegian Aquaculture Center

References

External links
bronnoysund.com - Local portal for Brønnøysund and Brønnøy (in Norwegian)
Municipal fact sheet from Statistics Norway 

 
Municipalities of Nordland
1838 establishments in Norway